The 2013–14 network television schedule for the five major English-language commercial broadcast networks in the United States covers primetime hours from September 2013 to August 2014. The schedule is followed by a list per network of returning series, new series, and series canceled after the 2012–13 season.

NBC was the first to announce its fall schedule on May 12, 2013, followed by Fox on May 13, ABC on May 14, CBS on May 15, and The CW on May 16, 2013.

PBS is not included; member stations have local flexibility over most of their schedules and broadcast times for network shows may vary. The CW is not included on weekends, when it does not offer network programming. Ion Television and MyNetworkTV are also not included since the majority of both networks' schedules comprise syndicated reruns (with limited original programming on the former).

New series are highlighted in bold.

All times are U.S. Eastern and Pacific time (except for some live events or specials). Subtract one hour for Central, Mountain, Alaska and Hawaii-Aleutian times.

Note: From February 6 to February 23, 2014, all NBC primetime programming was pre-empted for coverage of the 2014 Sochi Winter Olympics.

Each of the 30 highest-rated shows is listed with its rank and rating as determined by Nielsen Media Research.

Legend

Sunday

Monday

Tuesday

Wednesday

Thursday

Friday

Note: Us & Them was originally set to air in the spring until Fox decided not to broadcast it.

Saturday

By network

ABC

Returning series:
20/20
ABC Saturday Movie of the Week
America's Funniest Home Videos
The Bachelor
The Bachelorette
Bet on Your Baby
Castle
Dancing with the Stars
Extreme Weight Loss
Grey's Anatomy
Last Man Standing
The Middle
Mistresses
Modern Family
Motive
Nashville
The Neighbors
NY Med
Once Upon a Time
Primetime: What Would You Do?
Revenge
Rookie Blue
Saturday Night Football
Scandal
Shark Tank
Suburgatory
The Taste
Wife Swap
Wipeout

New series:
Agents of S.H.I.E.L.D.
The Assets *
Bachelor in Paradise *
Back in the Game
Betrayal
Black Box *
The Goldbergs
The Great Christmas Light Fight
Killer Women *
Lucky 7
Mind Games *
Mixology *
Once Upon a Time in Wonderland
The Quest *
Resurrection *
Rising Star *
Sing Your Face Off *
Super Fun Night
Trophy Wife

Canceled/Ended
666 Park Avenue
Body of Proof
Don't Trust the B---- in Apartment 23
Family Tools
Happy Endings
How to Live with Your Parents (For the Rest of Your Life)
Last Resort
Malibu Country
Private Practice
Red Widow
Whodunnit?
Zero Hour

CBS

Returning series:
2 Broke Girls
48 Hours
60 Minutes
The Amazing Race
The Big Bang Theory
Big Brother
Blue Bloods
Criminal Minds
CSI: Crime Scene Investigation
Elementary
The Good Wife
Hawaii Five-0
How I Met Your Mother
The Mentalist
Mike & Molly
NCIS
NCIS: Los Angeles
Person of Interest
Survivor
Two and a Half Men
Undercover Boss
 Under the Dome
Unforgettable

New series:
Bad Teacher *
The Crazy Ones
Extant *
Friends with Better Lives *
Hostages
Intelligence *
The Millers
Mom
Reckless *
We Are Men

Canceled/Ended
CSI: NY
Golden Boy
The Job
Made in Jersey
Partners
Rules of Engagement
Vegas

The CW

Returning series:
America's Next Top Model
Arrow
Beauty & the Beast
The Carrie Diaries
Hart of Dixie
Nikita
Supernatural
The Vampire Diaries
Whose Line Is It Anyway?

New series:
The 100 *
Backpackers *
Famous in 12 *
Masters of Illusion *
The Originals
Penn & Teller: Fool Us  *
Reign
Seed *
Star-Crossed *
The Tomorrow People

Canceled/Ended
90210
Breaking Pointe
Capture
Cult
Emily Owens, M.D.
Gossip Girl
Oh Sit!
Perfect Score

Fox

Returning series:
American Dad!
American Idol
Baseball Night in America
Bob's Burgers
Bones
Family Guy
The Following
Fox College Football
Glee
Hell's Kitchen
Hotel Hell
Kitchen Nightmares
MasterChef
The Mindy Project
New Girl
NFL on Fox
The OT
Raising Hope
The Simpsons
So You Think You Can Dance
The X Factor

New series:
24: Live Another Day *
Almost Human
Brain Games *
Brooklyn Nine-Nine
Cosmos: A Spacetime Odyssey *
Dads
Enlisted *
Gang Related *
I Wanna Marry "Harry" *
MasterChef Junior *
Rake *
Riot *
Sleepy Hollow
Surviving Jack *
Us & Them *

Canceled/Ended
Ben and Kate
The Cleveland Show
COPS (moved to Paramount Network)
Fringe
The Mob Doctor
Touch

NBC

Returning series:
American Ninja Warrior
America's Got Talent
The Biggest Loser
Chicago Fire
Community
Dateline NBC
Football Night in America
Grimm
Hannibal
Hollywood Game Night
Last Comic Standing
Law & Order: Special Victims Unit
NBC Sunday Night Football
Parenthood
Parks and Recreation
Revolution
The Sing-Off
The Voice

New series:
About a Boy *
American Dream Builders *
Believe *
The Blacklist
Chicago P.D. *
Crisis *
Crossbones *
Dracula
Food Fighters *
Growing Up Fisher *
Ironside
The Michael J. Fox Show
The Million Second Quiz
The Night Shift *
Running Wild with Bear Grylls *
Sean Saves the World
Taxi Brooklyn *
Undateable *
Welcome to Sweden *
Welcome to the Family
Working the Engels *

Canceled/Ended
1600 Penn
30 Rock
Animal Practice
Betty White's Off Their Rockers (moved to Lifetime)
Camp
Deception
Do No Harm
Fashion Star 
Go On
Guys with Kids
The New Normal
The Office
Ready for Love
Rock Center with Brian Williams
Smash
Up All Night
Whitney

Renewals and cancellations

Full season pickups

ABC
Agents of S.H.I.E.L.D.—Picked up for a full twenty-two-episode season on October 10, 2013.
The Goldbergs—Picked up for a full season on November 1, 2013.
Shark Tank—Picked up two additional episodes on October 10, 2013, then an additional four episodes for a twenty-eight-episode season on December 12, 2013.
Super Fun Night—Picked up four additional episodes for a total of seventeen on November 1, 2013.
Trophy Wife—Picked up for a full season on November 1, 2013.

CBS
The Crazy Ones—Picked up for a full season on October 18, 2013.
The Millers—Picked up for a full season on October 18, 2013.
Mom—Picked up for a full season on October 18, 2013.
Person of Interest—Picked up one additional episode for a total of twenty-three on November 12, 2013.

The CW
The Originals—Picked up for a full season on November 11, 2013.
Reign—Picked up for a full season on November 11, 2013.
The Tomorrow People—Picked up for a full season on November 11, 2013.

Fox
Brooklyn Nine-Nine—Picked up for a full season on October 18, 2013.
Dads—Picked up for a full season on October 25, 2013. Reduced from twenty-two to nineteen episodes on December 6.

NBC
The Blacklist—Picked up for a full twenty-two-episode season on October 4, 2013.
Chicago P.D.—Picked up for two additional episodes for a total of fifteen on January 31, 2014.
Sean Saves the World—Picked up five additional episodes for a total of eighteen on November 8, 2013.

Renewals

ABC
20/20—Renewed for a thirty-sixth season on May 13, 2014.
Agents of S.H.I.E.L.D.—Renewed for a second season on May 8, 2014.
America's Funniest Home Videos—Renewed for a twenty-fifth season on May 9, 2014.
The Bachelor—Renewed for a nineteenth season on May 9, 2014.
Castle—Renewed for a seventh season on May 8, 2014.
Dancing with the Stars—Renewed for a nineteenth season on May 9, 2014.
The Goldbergs—Renewed for a second season on May 8, 2014.
Grey's Anatomy—Renewed for an eleventh season on May 8, 2014.
Last Man Standing—Renewed for a fourth season on May 10, 2014.
The Middle—Renewed for a sixth season on May 8, 2014.
Modern Family—Renewed for a sixth season on May 8, 2014.
Nashville—Renewed for a third season on May 9, 2014.
Once Upon a Time—Renewed for a fourth season on May 8, 2014.
Resurrection—Renewed for a second season on May 8, 2014.
Revenge—Renewed for a fourth season on May 8, 2014.
Scandal—Renewed for a fourth season on May 8, 2014.
Shark Tank—Renewed for a sixth season on May 9, 2014.
The Taste—Renewed for a third season on May 13, 2014.

CBS
2 Broke Girls—Renewed for a fourth season on March 13, 2014.
48 Hours—Renewed for a twenty-seventh season on March 13, 2014.
60 Minutes—Renewed for a forty-seventh season on March 13, 2014.
The Amazing Race—Renewed for a twenty-fifth season on March 13, 2014.
The Big Bang Theory—Renewed for three additional seasons through the 2016–17 season on March 12, 2014.
Blue Bloods—Renewed for a fifth season on March 13, 2014.
Criminal Minds—Renewed for a tenth season on March 13, 2014.
CSI: Crime Scene Investigation—Renewed for a fifteenth season on March 13, 2014.
Elementary—Renewed for a third season on March 13, 2014.
Extant—Renewed for a second season on October 9, 2014.
The Good Wife—Renewed for a sixth season on March 13, 2014.
Hawaii Five-0—Renewed for a fifth season on March 13, 2014.
The Mentalist—Renewed for a seventh and final season on May 10, 2014.
Mike & Molly—Renewed for a fifth season on March 13, 2014.
The Millers—Renewed for a second season on March 13, 2014.
Mom—Renewed for a second season on March 13, 2014.
NCIS—Renewed for a twelfth season on March 13, 2014.
NCIS: Los Angeles—Renewed for a sixth season on March 13, 2014.
Person of Interest—Renewed for a fourth season on March 13, 2014.
Survivor—Renewed for a twenty-ninth and thirtieth season on December 12, 2013.
Two and a Half Men—Renewed for a twelfth and final season on March 13, 2014.
Undercover Boss—Renewed for a sixth season on March 13, 2014.
Under the Dome—Renewed for a third season on October 9, 2014.

The CW
The 100—Renewed for a second season on May 8, 2014.
America's Next Top Model—Renewed for a twenty-first season on October 18, 2013.
Arrow—Renewed for a third season on February 13, 2014.
Beauty & the Beast—Renewed for a third season on May 8, 2014.
Hart of Dixie—Renewed for a fourth season on May 8, 2014.
Masters of Illusion–Renewed for a third season on November 17, 2014.
The Originals—Renewed for a second season on February 13, 2014.
 Penn & Teller: Fool Us—Renewed for a second season on November 17, 2014.
Reign—Renewed for a second season on February 13, 2014.
Supernatural—Renewed for a tenth season on February 13, 2014.
The Vampire Diaries—Renewed for a sixth season on February 13, 2014.
Whose Line Is It Anyway?—Renewed for an eleventh season on May 15, 2014.

Fox
American Idol—Renewed for a fourteenth season on May 7, 2014.
Bob's Burgers—Renewed for a fifth season on September 26, 2013.
Bones—Renewed for a tenth season on January 29, 2014.
Brooklyn Nine-Nine—Renewed for a second season on March 7, 2014.
Family Guy—Renewed for a thirteenth season on May 9, 2014.
The Following—Renewed for a third season on March 7, 2014.
Glee—Renewed for a sixth and final season on April 19, 2013. 
MasterChef Junior—Renewed for a second season on December 19, 2013. Renewed again for a third season on March 5, 2014.
The Mindy Project—Renewed for a third season on March 7, 2014.
New Girl—Renewed for a fourth season on March 7, 2014.
Sleepy Hollow—Renewed for a second season on October 3, 2013.
So You Think You Can Dance—Renewed for a twelfth season on November 17, 2014.
The Simpsons—Renewed for a twenty-sixth season on October 4, 2013.

NBC
About a Boy—Renewed for a second season on May 9, 2014.
American Ninja Warrior—Renewed for a fourth season on July 13, 2014.
America's Got Talent—Renewed for a tenth season on July 13, 2014.
The Apprentice—Renewed for a fourteenth season on March 19, 2014.
The Biggest Loser—Renewed for a sixteenth season on March 19, 2014.
The Blacklist—Renewed for a second season on December 3, 2013.
Chicago Fire—Renewed for a third season on March 19, 2014.
Chicago P.D.—Renewed for a second season on March 19, 2014.
Food Fighters—Renewed for a second season on January 21, 2015.
Football Night in America—Renewed for a ninth season on December 14, 2011.
Grimm—Renewed for a fourth season on March 19, 2014.
Hannibal—Renewed for a third season on May 9, 2014.
Hollywood Game Night—Renewed for a third season on October 3, 2014.
Law & Order: Special Victims Unit—Renewed for a sixteenth season on May 7, 2014.
Last Comic Standing—Renewed for a ninth season on July 13, 2014.
NBC Sunday Night Football—Renewed for a ninth season on December 14, 2011.
The Night Shift—Renewed for a second season on July 1, 2014.
Parenthood—Renewed for a sixth and final season on May 11, 2014.
Parks and Recreation—Renewed for a seventh and final season on March 19, 2014.
The Sing-Off—Renewed for a fifth season on October 1, 2014.
Undateable—Renewed for a second season on July 31, 2014.
The Voice—Renewed for a seventh season on March 19, 2014.
Welcome to Sweden—Renewed for a second season on August 4, 2014.

Cancellations/Series endings

ABC
The Assets—Canceled on January 10, 2014 after two low-rated episodes. The finale aired on August 3, 2014.
Back in the Game—Canceled on November 1, 2013 with no more episodes set to air after the initial thirteen due to low ratings.
Betrayal—Canceled on May 9, 2014.
Black Box—Canceled on August 7, 2014.
Killer Women—Canceled on May 9, 2014.
Lucky 7—Canceled on October 4, 2013 after two low-rated episodes. This is the first cancellation of the season.
Mind Games—Canceled on March 27, 2014 after five low-rated episodes.
Mixology—Canceled on May 8, 2014.
The Neighbors—Canceled on May 9, 2014.
Once Upon a Time in Wonderland—Canceled on March 28, 2014. The series finale aired the following Thursday.
Suburgatory—Canceled on May 9, 2014.
Super Fun Night—Canceled on May 9, 2014.
Trophy Wife—Canceled on May 8, 2014.

CBS
Bad Teacher—Canceled on May 10, 2014.
The Crazy Ones—Canceled on May 10, 2014.
Friends with Better Lives—Canceled on May 10, 2014. The remaining episodes were burned off on Amazon Prime Video. The series concluded on September 30, 2014.
Hostages—Canceled on May 10, 2014.
How I Met Your Mother—It was announced on January 30, 2013 that season nine would be the final season. The series concluded on March 31, 2014.
Intelligence—Canceled on May 10, 2014.
Reckless—Canceled on October 9, 2014 after one season.
Unforgettable—Canceled on October 10, 2014. On February 6, 2015, It was announced that A&E would pick up the series for another season.
We Are Men—Canceled on October 9, 2013 after two low-rated episodes.

The CW
Backpackers—Canceled on July 23, 2014 after two low rated episodes.
The Carrie Diaries—Canceled on May 8, 2014 after two seasons.
Famous in 12—Canceled on July 3, 2014 after five low rated episodes.
Nikita—It was announced on May 16, 2013 that season four would the final season. The series concluded on December 27, 2013.
Seed—Canceled on July 23, 2014 after two low rated episodes.
Star-Crossed—Canceled on May 8, 2014.
The Tomorrow People—Canceled on May 8, 2014.

Fox
 24: Live Another Day—The limited series was meant to run for one season only; it concluded on July 14, 2014
 Almost Human—Canceled on April 29, 2014.
 American Dad!—It was announced on July 16, 2013 that the show will move to TBS for season eleven.
 Dads—Canceled on May 7, 2014. The series concluded on July 16, 2014.
 Enlisted—Canceled on May 7, 2014. The series finale aired on June 22.
 Gang Related—Canceled on September 2, 2014 after one season.
 I Wanna Marry "Harry"—Canceled on June 12, 2014 after four low rated episodes.
 Kitchen Nightmares—It was announced on June 23, 2014 that Ramsay is ending the show with the current season.
 Murder Police—It was announced on October 8, 2013 that Fox will not air the show; the series has been shopped to cable networks.
 Raising Hope—Canceled on March 10, 2014 after four seasons. The two remaining episodes aired back-to-back as a "farewell event" on April 4.
 Rake—Canceled on May 7, 2014. The series finale aired on June 27.
 Riot—Canceled on June 12, 2014 after four low rated episodes.
 Surviving Jack—Canceled on May 7, 2014. The final episode aired the following day.
 Us & Them—It was announced on October 11, 2013 that production would not continue and that the seven produced episodes would air. It was later announced in summer 2014 that Fox would not air the show.
 The X Factor—Canceled on February 7, 2014 after three seasons, due to a combination of low ratings, high cost and the departure of creator and judge Simon Cowell, who is returning to Britain.

NBC
Believe—Canceled on May 9, 2014. The series finale aired on June 15.
Community—Canceled on May 9, 2014, picked up by Yahoo! for its sixth season.
Crisis—Canceled on May 9, 2014.
Crossbones—Canceled on July 24, 2014. The two remaining episodes were burned off on August 2.
Dracula—Canceled on May 10, 2014.
Growing Up Fisher—Canceled on May 9, 2014.
Ironside—Canceled on October 18, 2013 after three low rated episodes. Pulled off the schedule after episode 4.
The Michael J. Fox Show—Canceled on May 10, 2014.
Revolution—Canceled on May 9, 2014.
Sean Saves the World—Canceled on January 28, 2014.
Taxi Brooklyn—Canceled on March 6, 2015.
Welcome to the Family—Canceled on October 18, 2013 after three low rated episodes.
Working the Engels—Canceled on August 20, 2014 after five low rated episodes.

See also
2013–14 United States network television schedule (daytime)
2013–14 United States network television schedule (late night)

References

United States primetime network television schedules
2013 in American television
2014 in American television